The Escorts (Later The Do's and The Don'ts) is a 24 track album featuring "the best of" or greatest hits by The Escorts (Later The Do's and The Don'ts) from Cedar Rapids, Iowa, USA. These are original recordings of all 12 singles released by The Escorts, later known as The Do's & The Don'ts. "On Top of Old Smokey" and "Twelfth of Never" are covers. This CD features "I Wonder If She Loves Me" written by Roger Booth (Red Bird Records single #10-072), which was listed as a "spotlight single" in the July 2, 1966, issue of Billboard Magazine. Record World Magazine listed it among "singles coming up," reaching #35 in the August 20 & 27 issues. KIOA Des Moines listed it at #14 on July 4, 1966; WAKX Duluth listed it at #6 on August 5, 1966; and WEBC Duluth listed it at #5 on August 6, 1966.

Track listing
"Judy or Jo Ann"
"Main Drag"
"I Wanna Do It"
"I Found Love"
"The Wobble Drum"
"On Top of Old Smokey"
"Heart of Mine"
"Twelfth of Never"
"Our Love May Not Live Again"
"I Wonder If She Loves Me"
"I Still Remember The Past"
"Be Sure"
"The Scrogg"
"Loving You The Way I Do"
"Cherry Lane"
"Girl In The Corner"
"Let The Sun Shine Free"
"She's Walking Out Of Life"
"Woman"
"No One To Talk My Troubles To"
"Hot Rock and Roll To Go"
"Being With You Girl"
"Space Walk"
"You're The One"

External links
The Escorts (Later The Do's & Don'ts)
The Do's and Don'ts on Facebook
Fan videos

1997 greatest hits albums